The Jazz Girl is a 1926 American silent drama film directed by Howard M. Mitchell and starring Gaston Glass, Edith Roberts and Howard Truesdale. The film is presumed lost.

Cast
 Gaston Glass as Rodneey Blake 
 Edith Roberts as Janet Marsh 
 Howard Truesdale as John Marsh 
 Murdock MacQuarrie as Henry Wade 
 Coit Albertson as Frank Arnold 
 Ernie Adams as Detective 
 Sabel Johnson as Big Bertha 
 Dick Sutherland as The Chef 
 Lea Delworth as Sadie Soakum

References

Bibliography
 Munden, Kenneth White. The American Film Institute Catalog of Motion Pictures Produced in the United States, Part 1. University of California Press, 1997.

External links

1926 films
1926 drama films
Silent American drama films
Films directed by Howard M. Mitchell
American silent feature films
1920s English-language films
American black-and-white films
1920s American films